High Incident was a police drama television series produced by DreamWorks Television for the ABC network. The show was created by Steven Spielberg, Michael Pavone, Eric Bogosian, and Dave Alan Johnson. It aired from March 4, 1996, to May 8, 1997, running a total of 32 episodes.

Premise
The show focused on the everyday stories of a group of El Camino Police Department (ECPD) officers investigating and solving crimes.

Cast
 Matthew Beck as Officer Terry Hagar
 Dylan Bruno as Officer Andy Lightner (season 1)
 Matt Craven as Officer Lenny Gayer
 Wendy Davis as Lynette White
 Aunjanue Ellis as Officer Leslie Joyner
 Cole Hauser as Officer Randy Willitz
 David Keith as Senior Lead Officer Jim Marsh
 Catherine Kellner as Officer Gayle Van Camp (season 1)
 Julio Oscar Mechoso as Officer Richie Fernandez (season 1)
 Louis Mustillo as Officer Russell Topps
 Lindsay Frost as Sergeant Helen Sullivan (season 2)
 Blair Underwood as Senior Lead Officer Michael Rhoades (season 2)
 Lisa Vidal as Officer Jessica Helgado (season 2)

Production
The executive producers of the series are Michael Pavone, Dave Alan Johnson, and Eric Bogosian, with Charles Haid as the co-executive producer-director. Steven Spielberg receives story credit, with Haid noting that "Steven Spielberg is on the set almost every day." High Incident was filmed in the San Fernando Valley neighborhood of Chatsworth, Los Angeles, which doubles for the fictional El Camino.

The series was renewed for a second season, but was moved to the Thursday at 8:00 p.m. timeslot opposite Friends on NBC, with Blair Underwood, Lisa Vidal, and Lindsay Frost joining the cast. Although it received good reviews and fair ratings, it was canceled after the end of its second season in May 1997, due to its lower ratings against NBC's Friends and The Single Guy, and CBS's Diagnosis: Murder on Thursday evenings.

Episodes

Series overview

Broadcast history
 Mondays 9:00 p.m. (March 4, 1996 – April 15, 1996)
 Thursdays 8:00 p.m. (August 15, 1996 – May 8, 1997)
 Tuesday 10:00 p.m. (Special "preview" premiere time for second-season premiere on September 17, 1996)

Season 1 (1996)

Season 2 (1996–97)

Reception
Todd Everett of Variety describes some of the series' characters as being a "tired stereotype", but praises director/co-exec producer Charles Haid for getting "a lot out of his fine cast, and several of the action scenes show above-average energy."

References

 
 
 https://www.thefreelibrary.com/REAL+LAPD+OFFICERS+KEEP+AN+EYE+ON+%27HIGH+INCIDENT%27.-a083923808

External links
 

1990s American crime drama television series
1990s American police procedural television series
1996 American television series debuts
1997 American television series endings
English-language television shows
American Broadcasting Company original programming
Television shows set in Los Angeles
Television shows scored by Hans Zimmer
Television shows scored by John Powell
Television series by DreamWorks Television